Matthew Avery Modine (born March 22, 1959) is an American actor and filmmaker, who rose to prominence through his role as U.S. Marine Private/Sergeant J.T. "Joker" Davis in Full Metal Jacket. His other film roles include the title character in Birdy, the high school wrestler Louden Swain in Vision Quest, FBI agent Mike Downey in Married to the Mob, Joe Slovak in Gross Anatomy, William Shaw in Cutthroat Island, Drake Goodman in Pacific Heights, Peter Foley in The Dark Knight Rises, and Dr. Ralph Wyman in Short Cuts. On television, Modine portrays the villainous Dr. Martin Brenner in Netflix's Stranger Things, the oversexed Sullivan Groff on Weeds, Dr. Don Francis in And the Band Played On and Ivan Turing in Proof.

Modine has been nominated twice for a Golden Globe Award for Best Actor in a Miniseries or Motion Picture Made for Television for his work in And the Band Played On and What the Deaf Man Heard and received a special Golden Globe for him and the rest of the ensemble in Short Cuts. He was also nominated for a Primetime Emmy Award for Outstanding Lead Actor in a Miniseries or a Special for And the Band Played On.

Early life
Modine, the youngest of seven children, was born in Loma Linda, California, the son of Dolores (née Warner), a bookkeeper, and Mark Alexander Modine, who managed drive-in theaters. He is the nephew of the stage actress Nola Modine Fairbanks, and the great-grandson of the prospector and pioneer Ralph Jacobus Fairbanks. One of his paternal  great-grandfathers was a Swedish immigrant. Modine lived in Utah for several years, moving every year or two. The drive-in theaters his father managed were being torn down because the land beneath them exceeded the value of the theaters. The Modine family returned to Imperial Beach, California where Matthew attended and graduated from Mar Vista High School in 1977.

Career
Modine's first film role was in John Sayles' film Baby It's You (1983). Also that year, he co-starred in the sex comedy Private School, with Phoebe Cates and Betsy Russell. His performances caught the eye of director Harold Becker, who cast him in Vision Quest (1985), based on Terry Davis's novel.

The director Robert Altman propelled Modine to international stardom with his film adaptation of David Rabe's play Streamers. Modine played Mel Gibson's brother in Mrs. Soffel and starred with Nicolas Cage in Alan Parker's Birdy; the film was awarded Grand Prix at the Cannes Film Festival. The actor also famously turned down the role of LT Pete "Maverick" Mitchell in Top Gun (the role that Tom Cruise made famous), because he felt the film's pro-military stance went against his politics.

Modine may be best known for his role as Private/Sergeant J.T. "Joker" Davis, the central character of Stanley Kubrick's Vietnam War movie Full Metal Jacket (1987). Subsequently, Modine played the dangerous young criminal Treat in Alan Pakula's film adaptation of Lyle Kessler's stageplay Orphans. Modine played the goofy, earnest FBI agent Mike Downey in Jonathan Demme's screwball comedy Married to the Mob opposite Michelle Pfeiffer. In 1990, he led the cast of Memphis Belle, a fictionalized account of the famous B-17 Flying Fortress.

In 1995, he appeared opposite Geena Davis in the romantic action-adventure film Cutthroat Island. Modine made his feature directorial debut with If... Dog... Rabbit..., which came after the success of three short films debuting at the Sundance Film Festival: When I Was a Boy (co-directed with Todd Field), Smoking written by David Sedaris, and Ecce Pirate written by Modine.

His dark comedy, I Think I Thought, debuted at the Tribeca Film Festival. The film tells the story of a Thinker (Modine) who ends up in Thinkers Anonymous.

Other short films include To Kill an American, Cowboy, and The Love Film. In 2011, he completed Jesus Was a Commie, an avant-garde-dialectical conversation about the world and the prominent issues of modern society. Modine co-directed the short film with Terence Ziegler, the editor of I Think I Thought. Modine's short films have played internationally.

In 2003, he guest-starred in The West Wing episode "The Long Goodbye." He portrayed the character Marco, who went to high school with C.J. Cregg (Allison Janney) and who helped her deal with her father's steady mental decline due to Alzheimer's disease. Modine agreed to take the role because he is a longtime friend of Janney. (The two appeared together in a theatrical production of the play Breaking Up directed by Stuart Ross). That same year, he played Fritz Gerlich in the CBS miniseries Hitler: The Rise of Evil.

In 2004, Modine appeared in Funky Monkey as ex-football star turned spy Alec McCall, who teams up with super-chimp Clemens and his friend Michael Dean (Seth Adkins) to take down the villainous Flick (Taylor Negron). The film was critically panned, yet has gained a cult status.

In 2005, Abel Ferrara's Mary won the Special Jury Prize at the Venice Film Festival. In the film, Modine portrays a director recounting the story of Mary Magdalene (Juliette Binoche). The following year, he guest-starred in the Law & Order: Special Victims Unit episode "Rage" as a serial killer of young girls.

In 2010, Modine appeared in The Trial, which was awarded the Parents Television Council's Seal of Approval™. The PTC said: "'The Trial' combines the best features of courtroom drama, murder mystery, and character story. 'The Trial' is a powerful drama which shows the power of healing and hope." Modine played a corrupt Majestic City developer named "Sullivan Groff" throughout Season 3 on Weeds. Groff has affairs with Nancy Botwin (Mary-Louise Parker) and Celia Hodes (Elizabeth Perkins). Also in 2010, Modine appeared in HBO's Too Big to Fail, a film about the Wall Street financial crisis. Modine stars as John Thain, former Chairman and CEO of Merrill Lynch.

In 2011, Modine completed two independent films, Family Weekend and Girl in Progress, opposite Eva Mendes. In 2012, he appeared in Christopher Nolan's The Dark Knight Rises as Deputy Commissioner Peter Foley, a Gotham City police officer and peer to Gary Oldman's Commissioner James Gordon.

In February 2013, Modine was cast in Ralph Bakshi's animated film Last Days of Coney Island after coming across the film's Kickstarter campaign online. In 2014, he co-starred with Olivia Williams, Richard Dillane, and Steve Oram in the horror mystery film Altar.

In 2016, Modine played Dr. Martin Brenner in the Netflix original series Stranger Things. In 2017, he and his Stranger Things castmates won the Screen Actors Guild Award for Outstanding Performance by an Ensemble in a Drama Series. In 2017, Matthew Modine was featured in the music video for "1-800-273-8255", a song by American hip hop artist Logic. Modine was part of Speed Kills released in November 2018 as well as several upcoming films such as Foster Boy, Miss Virginia, and The Martini Shot.

Theater
Modine appeared in Arthur Miller's Finishing the Picture at Chicago's Goodman Theatre, in Miller's Resurrection Blues at London's Old Vic, and in a stage adaptation of Harper Lee's To Kill a Mockingbird (as Atticus Finch) at Connecticut's Hartford Stage. This production of To Kill a Mockingbird became the most successful play in the theatre's 45-year history. In 2010, he starred with Abigail Breslin in the 50th Anniversary Broadway revival of The Miracle Worker at the Circle in the Square theatre.

In fall 2013, Modine starred in a self-parodying comedy, Matthew Modine Saves the Alpacas at Los Angeles' Geffen Theatre.

Activism

Cycling has been Modine's main mode of transportation since he moved to New York City from Utah in 1980. He heads a pro-bike organization called "Bicycle for a Day" and was honored for his work on June 2, 2009, by the environmental arts and education center on the East River, Solar 1.

In 2019, he ran for SAG-AFTRA national presidential election, challenging incumbent Gabrielle Carteris who ran a campaign marred by controversy and alleged corruption resulting in numerous unsuccessful protests filed by more than 15 union members who alleged dozens of violations against Carteris with the U.S Department of Labor. The U.S. Department of Labor's subsequent investigation into Carteris turned it into one of the most contentious campaigns in both Screen Actors Guild and SAG-AFTRA elections. The complaints were unsuccessful, and the investigation found no reason to set aside Cateris’s election. Modine ran again in 2021 and was defeated by Fran Drescher by a margin of 52.5% to 47.5%.

Personal life
Modine married Caridad Rivera, a makeup and wardrobe stylist, in 1980. They have two children, Boman, an assistant director for films, and actress, singer and ballet dancer Ruby Modine.

Tributes
Modine is the subject of the 2005 song "Matthew Modine" by Pony Up.

Filmography

Film

Television

Music videos

Theater

Awards and nominations

References

External links

 
 
 
 Bicycle for a Day
 Full Metal Jacket Diary

1959 births
Living people
20th-century American male actors
21st-century American male actors
American male film actors
American male television actors
American male voice actors
American people of English descent
American people of Swedish descent
Male actors from California
Male actors from Salt Lake City
People from Loma Linda, California
People from Imperial Beach, California
Volpi Cup for Best Actor winners
Volpi Cup winners